Christian Poos (born 5 November 1977) is a Luxembourgian cyclist. His sporting career began with Velo Club SaF Zeisseng.

Major results

1997
1st U23 Liège-Bastogne-Liège
2nd National Road Race Championships
1999
 National Time Trial Champion
2nd Tour de la Somme
2nd Chrono des Nations U23
2000
2nd National Road Race Championships
2001
 National Road Race Champion
2002
 National Road Race Champion
 National Time Trial Champion
3rd Duo Normand (with Andy Cappelle)
2003
 National Time Trial Champion
3rd National Road Race Championships
2007
 National Time Trial Champion
2nd National Road Race Championships
2008
2nd National Time Trial Championships
3rd National Road Race Championships
2009
1st Grand Prix François-Faber
3rd National Time Trial Championships
2010
1st Grand Prix François-Faber
3rd National Time Trial Championships
2011
 National Time Trial Champion
1st Stage 4 Cycling Tour of Sibiu

References

1977 births
Living people
Luxembourgian male cyclists
Sportspeople from Luxembourg City